The Roncovalgrande Hydroelectric Plant, also known as the Delio Hydroelectric Plant, is located  north of Maccagno in the Province of Varese, Lombardy, Italy. The power plant was complete in 1971 and the last generator operational in 1973. The lower reservoir, Lago Maggiore, already existed. The power plant itself is located underground in between Delio and Maggiore. At the power plant, eight four-stage Pelton turbine-generators generate electricity. Power generation occurs during periods of high energy demand and when energy demand is low, pumping usually occurs. The pumps are on the same shaft as the Pelton turbines and send water from the lower to the upper reservoir to serve as stored energy. Later on, this water will be sent back down to the power station and the process will repeat.

See also

Hydroelectricity in Italy
List of pumped-storage hydroelectric power stations

References

Dams completed in 1971
Energy infrastructure completed in 1971
Energy infrastructure completed in 1973
Dams in Italy
Hydroelectric power stations in Italy
Pumped-storage hydroelectric power stations in Italy